Nye or NYE may refer to:

People
 Nye (surname)

Given name
 Nye Perram (born 1969), Australian judge

Nickname
 Aneurin Bevan (1897–1960), British politician, often known as Nye Bevan
 Gordon Nye Frank Jr. (1939–2007), American dragster builder, often known as Nye Frank
 Nigel Tranter (1909–2000), British author, also known by his pseudonym Nye Tranter

Places

Antarctica
 Nye Glacier, a glacier on the Arrowsmith Peninsula in Graham Land
 Nye Mountains, a group of mountains in Enderby Land

Sweden
 Nye, Sweden, a village

United States

Cities and communities
 Nye, Montana, an unincorporated community
 Nye County, Nevada
 Nye, Oregon, an unincorporated community
 Nye Beach, Oregon, a central district of Newport
 Nye, Texas, a former town, now a neighborhood of Laredo
 Nye, West Virginia, an unincorporated community
 Nye, Wisconsin, an unincorporated community

Buildings
 Nye Block, a former historic commercial building in Johnson, Vermont
 Nye House, a historic building in Fremont, Nebraska

Natural features
 Nye Mountain, New York
 Nye Formation, Oregon

Other uses
 Nye Committee, a United States committee from 1934 to 1936
 Nye language, a dialect of a Jukunoid language of Nigeria
 Nye Lubricants, an American company established in 1844
 New Year's Eve

See also
 Nigh, a surname